Eixo e Eirol is a civil parish in the municipality of Aveiro, Portugal. It was formed in 2013 by the merger of the former parishes Eixo and Eirol. The population in 2011 was 6,324, in an area of 22.42 km2.

References

Freguesias of Aveiro, Portugal